Pod zvuki potseluyev is the debut studio album by Russian singer Olga Buzova, released on 6 October 2017 through Archer Music Production LLC.

Commercial performance 
In the first 15 minutes after the release, the album reached the top spot on iTunes in Russia, which was a record, as the album has 3 platinum in the same country and is one of the best-selling releases of 2017, as well as the most discussed. Olga received more than 10 awards and nominations for the album, including "Breakthrough of the Year".

Promotion  
Six official singles were released in support of the album: "Privykayu", "Lyudi ne verili", "Malo polovin", "Khit-parad", "Nepravilnaya" and "Beri menya", each of which had a music video.

After the release of the album, Olga announced a concert tour with the same name "Pod zvuki potseluyev" in the CIS countries. The first two concerts were held in St. Petersburg and Moscow, which took place on 2 and 3 November 2017.

Track listing

Certifications

References

2017 debut albums
Olga Buzova albums
Russian-language albums